The 1804 Delaware gubernatorial election was held on October 2, 1804.

Incumbent Democratic-Republican Governor David Hall was not eligible for re-election under the Delaware Constitution of 1792. 

Federalist nominee Nathaniel Mitchell defeated Democratic-Republican nominee Joseph Haslet with 52.02% of the vote.

General election

Results

References

Bibliography
 
 
 

1804
Delaware
Gubernatorial